The siege of Kemah (Turkish: Kemah Kuşatması) begun in winter and ended on 19 May 1515. The siege ended with a decisive victory for the Ottoman Empire over the Safavid Empire. The fortress was captured by Selim I on 19 May in 1515. With this victory, Ottomans created their safe border against the Safavids. 

After the conquest, Selim I marched to Southwest against his grandfather Bozkurt of Dulkadir. Also Bıyıklı Mehmed Pasha became an east front commander against Safavids.

References

Sources 

 Hoca Sadeddin Efendi. (1585). Tâcü’t-Tevârîh - IV. İstanbul 
 T.C. Genelkurmay Başkanlığı. (1990). Yavuz Sultan Selim ve Mısır Seferi. Ankara: Genelkurmay Basımevi.
 https://islamansiklopedisi.org.tr/biyikli-mehmed-pasa

1515 in the Ottoman Empire
16th century in Iran
Battles involving the Ottoman Empire
Battles involving Safavid Iran
History of Erzincan
Ottoman–Persian Wars
Shia–Sunni sectarian violence